Conger marginatus, the Hawaiian mustache conger, is a species of conger eel described by Achille Valenciennes in 1850.

References 

marginatus
Fish of Hawaii
Endemic fauna of Hawaii
Taxa named by Achille Valenciennes
Fish described in 1850